Ceratinia is a genus of clearwing (ithomiine) butterflies, named by Jacob Hübner in 1816. They are in the brush-footed butterfly family, Nymphalidae.

Species
Arranged alphabetically:
 Ceratinia cayana (Salvin, 1869)
 Ceratinia iolaia (Hewitson, 1856)
 Ceratinia neso (Hübner, [1806])
 Ceratinia tutia (Hewitson, 1852)

References

Ithomiini
Nymphalidae of South America
Nymphalidae genera
Taxa named by Jacob Hübner